Keibert Jose Ruiz (born July 20, 1998) is a Venezuelan professional baseball catcher for the Washington Nationals of Major League Baseball (MLB). He has previously played in MLB for the Los Angeles Dodgers.

Career

Los Angeles Dodgers
Ruiz was signed by the Los Angeles Dodgers as an international free agent in 2014 for $140,000. He made his professional debut with the Dominican Summer League Dodgers in 2015 and spent the whole season there, batting .300 with one home run, 19 RBIs, and eight doubles in 44 games. He spent 2016 with both the Arizona League Dodgers and the Ogden Raptors where he posted a combined .374 batting average with two home runs, 48 RBIs, a .412 OBP and a .939 OPS in 56 total games between both teams. In 2017, he began the year with the Great Lakes Loons where he was selected to the Midwest League mid-season All-Star Team and was then promoted to the Rancho Cucamonga Quakes of the California League. The Dodgers selected him as their Minor League Player of the Year for 2017 after he hit .316 with eight home runs and 51 RBIs in 101 games between Great Lakes and Rancho Cucamonga.

Ruiz was promoted to the Double-A Tulsa Drillers for the 2018 season and was selected to represent them at the mid-season Texas League All-Star Game. He was also selected to the "world" team at the All-Star Futures Game and to the Arizona Fall League Fall Stars game. In 101 games for Tulsa, he hit .268 with 12 home runs and 47 RBIs. The Dodgers added him to their 40-man roster after the 2018 season.

Ruiz began 2019 with Tulsa. He was selected to the mid-season Texas League All-Star Game. Ruiz was promoted to the Triple-A Oklahoma City Dodgers in July. However, he suffered a broken finger in early August that ended his season prematurely. Between the two levels, he hit .261 with six homers and 34 RBI in 85 games in 2019. 

Ruiz was called up to the Majors for the first time on August 15, 2020 and made his MLB debut the following day as the starting catcher against the Los Angeles Angels. He hit a home run in his first at-bat, against Julio Teherán of the Angels. He appeared in only two games during the pandemic shortened 2020 season, with two hits in eight at-bats. Ruiz was on the Dodgers roster for the 2020 National League Wild Card Series but did not appear in a game. He was left off the roster for the 2020 National League Division Series.

In 2021, Ruiz appeared in six games for the Dodgers, with one hit (a home run) in seven at-bats. With Oklahoma City, he hit .311 in 52 games with 16 homers and 45 RBI.

Washington Nationals
On July 30, 2021, the Dodgers traded Ruiz, Josiah Gray, Donovan Casey, and Gerardo Carrillo to the Washington Nationals in exchange for Trea Turner and Max Scherzer. Ruiz homered in his debut as a member of the Nationals organization on August 3, 2021 for the Triple-A Rochester Red Wings. Ruiz was called back up to the Majors on August 30 and made his Nationals debut the same day, going 1-4 against the Philadelphia Phillies. He would finish the season with a .272/.333/.409 slash line with 3 home runs in 96 plate appearances at the MLB level with the Dodgers and the Nationals.

On March 11, 2023, the Nationals announced that Ruiz had signed an eight-year contract extension. The contract, reportedly worth $50 million, ran through 2030, covering his last five seasons of club control and first three years of free agency, and included one-year club options for 2031 and 2032.

Awards and highlights
List of Major League Baseball players with a home run in their first major league at bat

References

External links

Living people
1998 births
Arizona League Dodgers players
Dominican Summer League Dodgers players
Venezuelan expatriate baseball players in the Dominican Republic
Glendale Desert Dogs players
Great Lakes Loons players
Los Angeles Dodgers players
Major League Baseball catchers
Major League Baseball players from Venezuela
Ogden Raptors players
Oklahoma City Dodgers players
Rancho Cucamonga Quakes players
Rochester Red Wings players
Sportspeople from Valencia, Venezuela
Tulsa Drillers players
Venezuelan expatriate baseball players in the United States
Washington Nationals players